Pankratz is a surname. Notable people with the surname include:

 Helmut Pankratz (born 1937), politician in Manitoba, Canada
 Loren Pankratz (born 1940), psychiatrist, mentalist, magician, author and noted skeptic 
 Marcia Pankratz (born 1964), former field hockey forward from the United States

Russian Mennonite surnames